Dauda is a West African given name.

Notable people
Notable people who have this name include:
 Dauda Badaru, Beninese politician
 Dauda Epo-Akara, Nigerian musician
 Dauda Izobo, Nigerian boxer
 Dauda Kamara, Sierra Leonean politician
 Dauda Musa Komo, Nigerian military officer